Antimargarita smithiana is a species of sea snail, a marine gastropod mollusk in the family Margaritidae.

Description

Distribution
This marine species occurs off East Antarctica and in the Bellinghausen Sea at depths between 30 m and 1117 m.

References

 Aldea C., Zelaya D.G. & Troncoso J.S. (2009) Two new trochids of the genus Antimargarita (Gastropoda: Vetigastropoda: Trochidae) from the Bellingshausen Sea and South Shetland Islands, Antarctica. Polar Biology 32:417–426
 Engl W. (2012) Shells of Antarctica. Hackenheim: Conchbooks. 402 pp

External links
 Aldea & Troncoso, Shelled Molluscs from West Antarctica; Iberus : Revista de la Sociedad Española de Malacología v. 26 (2008)

smithiana
Gastropods described in 1916